Parapediasia atalanta is a moth in the family Crambidae. It was described by Stanisław Błeszyński in 1963. It is found in Brazil.

References

Crambini
Moths described in 1963
Moths of South America